Snooky may refer to:

People
 Snooky Bellomo, American singer
 Snooky Lanson, stage name of Roy Landman (1914–1990), an American singer
 Snooky Pryor (1921–2006), an American blues harp player
 Snooky Serna (b. 1966), a Filipina film and television actress
 Snooky Young (1919–2011), an American jazz trumpeter

Other uses

 "Snooky Wookums", fictional feline from animated television series Krypto the Superdog

See also
 Snooker, a cue sport
 Snooki, nickname of Nicole Polizzi (b. 1987), an American reality television personality